The 1998 Philadelphia Wings season marked the team's twelfth season of operation.

Regular season

Conference standings

Game log
Reference:

Playoffs

Game log
Reference:

Roster
Reference:

See also
 Philadelphia Wings
 1998 NLL season

References

Philadelphia Wings seasons
1998 in lacrosse
Philly